Preble Shawnee High School is a public secondary school in Gratis Township, Ohio. Their nickname is the Arrows.

Athletics 
Preble Shawnee was a member of the Southwestern Buckeye League (SWBL) from 1984-2021. Since 2021, they have been members of the Western Ohio Athletic Conference.

SWBL Conference Championships From 2003-2004-2021-2022: (Buckeye Division, Unless Noted)

Girls Volleyball: 2011-2012, 2012-2013, 2013-2014, 2020-2021

Girls Soccer: 2013-2014

Girls Tennis: 2015-2016, 2016-2017, 2018-2019

Boys Basketball: 2003-2004 (Co, Southwestern) 2010-2011, 2016-2017, 2020-2021

Softball: 2011-2012

WOAC Conference Championships from 2021-2022-Present

Football: 2021-2022

Wrestling: 2021-2022

References

External links
 District Website

High schools in Preble County, Ohio
Public high schools in Ohio